An urothelial papilloma (or Transitional cell papilloma) is a papilloma developed from the urothelium.

References

Benign neoplasms
Glandular and epithelial neoplasia
Urothelial tumor
Urothelial lesion